Polkemmet Golf Club is a golf course located in Bathgate, West Lothian, Scotland.

Course
The course is located on the western boundary of Whitburn, on the B7066 Whitburn to Harthill Road. It offers the visitor a range of sporting activities similar to those provided by the Baillie family, who owned the estate for over 300 years.

Among the facilities include an information centre, golf course, golf driving range, bowling green, picnic and barbecue areas, play areas, restaurant and bar.

The public parkland course was opened in 1981 and is surrounded by mature woodland, with the River Almond dissecting a number of holes.

Measuring 3253 yards for men, and 2412 yards for ladies, with two Par 5s and one Par 3, Polkemmet Golf Course is designed to welcome men, women, beginners and juniors to the game, but also provides a stern challenge for the experienced golfer.

Polkemmet Golf Course is a Scottish Golf Union affiliated course with an emergent club membership, it also boasts a successful ClubGolf Junior Programme which attracts young talent from all over West Lothian and beyond.

References

External links

Golf clubs and courses in West Lothian
West Lothian
1981 establishments in Scotland
Sports venues completed in 1981